Andamaina Manasulo is a 2008 Indian Telugu-language romantic drama film directed by R. P. Patnaik and starring Rajiv, Remya and Archana Gupta.

The title of the film is based on a song of the same name from Jayam (2002).

Cast 
Rajiv as Tushar
Remya as Sandhya
Archana Gupta as Bindu
Vadde Naveen as Sandhya's husband
Sunil as Tushar's friend
Gollapudi Maruti Rao as Tushar's professor
Benarjee as Bindu's father
Sana as Bindu's mother
R. Narayana Murthy (special appearance)
R. P. Patnaik (special appearance)

Production 
Music composer R. P. Patnaik made his directorial debut with this film. He initially was to direct a film titled Avunantu Kadantu but the film did not enter frutition. Sindhu Menon was to be in the film but eventually did not feature. Newcomers Rajiv and Archanna Guptaa made their debut with this film. Remya Nambeesan made her Telugu debut with this film.

Reception 
A critic from Bangalore Mirror opined that "Unfortunately, the movie looks like a documentary. It lacks a tight script and fails to hold your attention for most of the second half". A critic from Filmibeat wrote that "The story and its movement by debutant director RP Patnaik are superb and he ran the entire film with the help of good screenplay". A critic from Indiaglitz said that "All in all, the film is just about average, though the comic track with Sunil and Lakshmipati is something that one will remember for a long time".

Awards
Nandi Awards of 2008
Best Story Writer

References 

2008 films

2000s Telugu-language films
Films scored by R. P. Patnaik￼